Live at Cobi's 2 is a live album by saxophonist Bill Barron which was recorded in 1985 and released posthumously on the SteepleChase label in 2006.

Track listing 
All compositions by Bill Barron except where noted.
 "September 1979" – 11:25
 "Spring Thing" – 15:39
 "What's New?" (Bob Haggart, Johnny Burke) – 8:52
 "Interpretation" – 14:58
 "Tragic Magin" (Kenny Barron) – 8:25
 "Cherokee" (Ray Noble) – 11:19

Personnel 
Bill Barron – tenor saxophone
Kenny Barron – piano
Cecil McBee – bass
Ben Riley – drums

References 

2006 live albums
SteepleChase Records live albums
Bill Barron (musician) live albums
Kenny Barron live albums